Al-Shajara was a Palestinian Arab village depopulated by Israel during the 1948 Arab-Israeli War when its residents were forcefully evacutaed and became refugees. It was located 14 kilometers west of Tiberias on the main highway to Nazareth  near the villages of Lubya and Hittin. The village was very close to the city of Nazareth, about 5 kilometers away.

The village was the fourth largest by area in Tiberias district. Its economy was based on agriculture. In 1944/45 it had 2,102 dunams (505 acres) planted with cereals and 544 dunams (136 acres) either irrigated or fig and olive orchards.

Al-Shajara was the home village of the cartoonist Naji al-Ali.

History
Ceramics from the Byzantine era have been found here, while the Crusaders referred to al-Shajara by "Seiera". The Arabic name of the village ash-Shajara translates as "the Tree".

Ottoman era
In 1596, al-Shajara  was part of the Ottoman Empire, nahiya (subdistrict) of Tiberias under the liwa' (district) of Safad with a population of 60 Muslim families and 12 Muslim bachelors. They paid a fixed tax-rate of 25% on agricultural products, including  wheat, barley, olives, fruits and cotton. Taxes was also paid  goats, beehives, orchards, and a press that was used either for processing olives or grapes; a total of 16,250 Akçe. 5/24 of the revenue went to a Waqf, the rest was  Ziamet land.

A party of French cavalry was apparently stationed in the village during  Napoleon's invasion of 1799. A map from the same campaign  by Pierre Jacotin  showed the place, named as Chagara.

Johann Ludwig Burckhardt, a Swiss traveler to Palestine who passed through the area around 1812, noted that the plain around the village was covered with wild artichoke, while William McClure Thomson said that al-Shajara (Sejera) was one of several villages in the area which was surrounded by gigantic hedges of cactus. He also noted the great oak woods in the vicinity.

Victor Guérin visited in 1875, and "discovered the ruins of a rectangular edifice built of cut stones, and oriented from west to east. Its height is 31 feet, and its breadth 18 feet 8 inches. Six monolithic columns decorated the interior, which they divided into two naves. Capitals are lying about on the ground, apparently of Byzantine style. This church was used for a mosque, for the traces of a mihrab are to be seen at the south end. On a fine slab, lying on the ground, are read the Greek letters  ΔΟΚΙ, each about four and a half inches high, and on a second slab the letter  Δ  placed above a I."

Gottlieb Schumacher found old graves and other antiquities when he explored the area in the 1880s. In the late nineteenth century, the village of al-Shajara was a stone-built village and had about 150 residents. The village was surrounded by arable land on which there were fig and olive trees, and there was a spring to the south.

In 1907, the residents of the nearby Jewish settlement of Sejera moved onto land within the village boundaries after buying it from the Sursock family (see Sursock Purchase). This triggered attacks from al-Shajara residents.

British Mandate era
In the 1922 census of Palestine conducted  by the British Mandate authorities, the population of Sjajara was 543 residents;  391 Muslims, 100 Jews and 52 Christians. where the Christians were all Orthodox.  By the  1931 census, Esh Shajara had 584 persons;  559 Muslims and 28 Christians, in a total of 123 houses.

This  had increased to 770 Muslims when the last census was made in the 1945 statistics.  
There were 720 Muslim and 50 Christians.  In 1944/45 the village had 2,102 dunams  of land used for cereals, and 544 dunams irrigated or used for orchards, while 100 dunams were built-up (urban) area.

1948, and aftermath
During the 1948 War, the Arab Liberation Army defending al-Shajara battled Israeli forces in the village in early March. It was captured by Israel on May 6, 1948, by the 12th Battalion, Golani Brigade — the entire population fled leaving twenty dead.

The Palestinian historian Walid Khalidi described the place in 1992: "The ruins of houses and broken steel bars protrude from beds of wild vegetation. One side of an arched doorway still stands. The western part of the site and the nearby hill are covered with cactus. Cattle barns belonging to the nearby settlement of Ilaniyya stand on the southern and eastern sides of the site. On the northern edge is a wide, deep well with a spiral stairway inside (used for periodic cleaning and maintenance of the well). Fig, doum-palm, and chinaberry trees grow in the area.

People from al-Shajara 
Naji al-Ali, cartoonist, assassinated in London 1987.
 "Abu Arab" Ibrahim Mohammed Saleh, Poet and Singer of the Palestinian Revolution, fled to Syria in 1948, returned in 2011, died in Homs, Syria in April 2014

See also
Depopulated Palestinian locations in Israel

References

Bibliography

 

 
  
 
 
 

 
  

  
 (p. 384)

External links
Welcome to al-Shajara
al-Shajara, Zochrot
Survey of Western Palestine, Map 6:  IAA, Wikimedia commons 
Shajara  from the Khalil Sakakini Cultural Center
Al-Sajarah, from Dr. Moslih Kanaaneh
, November 25, 2006 Zochrot 
Booklet about Shajara, downloadable, from  Zochrot

Arab villages depopulated during the 1948 Arab–Israeli War
District of Tiberias